Events in the year 1872 in India.

Incumbents
Richard Bourke, 6th Earl of Mayo, Viceroy 
Sir John Strachey, acting Viceroy (9–23 February)
Francis Napier, 10th Lord Napier, acting Viceroy (24 February – 3 May)
Thomas Baring, 1st Earl of Northbrook, Viceroy (from 3 May)

Events
National income - ₹3,376 million

Law
Indian Evidence Act
Indian Contract Act
 Indian Christian Marriage Act
Naturalisation Act (British statute)

Births
14 April – Abdullah Yusuf Ali, Islamic scholar who translated the Qur'an into English (died 1953).
15 August – Sri Aurobindo, nationalist, scholar, poet, mystic, evolutionary philosopher, yogi and guru (died 1950).
25 December – Ganganath Jha, scholar of Sanskrit, Indian philosophy and Buddhist philosophy (died 1941).

Deaths
8 February – Richard Bourke, 6th Earl of Mayo, Viceroy

 
India
Years of the 19th century in India